New Hampshire Route 32 (NH 32) is a state highway in the U.S. state of New Hampshire. The highway runs  from the Massachusetts state line in Richmond, where the highway continues as Massachusetts Route 32, north to NH 12 in Keene. NH 32 connects the southern Cheshire County towns of Richmond and Swanzey with Keene and Athol, Massachusetts.

Route description
NH 32 begins at the Massachusetts state line in the town of Richmond. The highway continues south as Massachusetts Route 32 (Richmond-Athol Road), which heads through Royalston toward Athol. NH 32 heads north as two-lane Athol Road to the center of Richmond, where the highway intersects NH 119 (Winchester Road/Fitzwilliam Road). The highway continues north as Old Homestead Highway, which enters the valley of the South Branch of the Ashuelot River as the route enters the town of Swanzey. NH 32 passes near the village of East Swanzey, through Swanzey proper, and then North Swanzey after entering the valley of the main stem of the river. In North Swanzey, the highway passes Dillant–Hopkins Airport. NH 32 enters the city of Keene immediately before it reaches its northern terminus at NH 12 (Main Street).

Junction list

References

External links

 New Hampshire State Route 32 on Flickr

032
Transportation in Cheshire County, New Hampshire